Samuel Joseph Gaviglio (born May 22, 1990) is an American professional baseball pitcher who is a free agent. He has played in Major League Baseball (MLB) for the Seattle Mariners, Kansas City Royals, and Toronto Blue Jays, and in the KBO League for the SSG Landers. Prior to playing professionally, he played college baseball for the Oregon State Beavers.

Amateur career
Gaviglio attended Ashland High School in Ashland, Oregon, graduating in 2008. He starred for his school's baseball team in his senior year; Gaviglio pitched to a 13–0 win–loss record with an earned run average (ERA) below 0.60, led Ashland High to victory in the Oregon state championship game, and was named the Class 5A Pitcher of the Year. The Tampa Bay Rays selected Gaviglio in the 40th round of the 2008 MLB draft, but he did not sign.

Gaviglio enrolled at Oregon State University to play college baseball for the Oregon State Beavers baseball team. As a freshman, Gaviglio pitched to a 10–1 win–loss record and a 2.73 ERA, and he was named a Freshman All-American. His sophomore year was limited by an injured hamstring. In his junior year, Gaviglio began the season with a streak of  scoreless innings pitched. He ended the season with a 12–2 win–loss record and a 1.87 ERA. Gaviglio was named to the All-Pacific-10 Conference's first team, Louisville Slugger named him a second-team All-American, and he was named a semifinalist for the Golden Spikes Award.

Professional career

St. Louis Cardinals
The St. Louis Cardinals selected Gaviglio in the fifth round, with the 170th overall selection, of the 2011 MLB draft. He signed with the Cardinals, receiving a $175,000 signing bonus, rather than return to Oregon State for his senior year. He made his professional debut with the Batavia Muckdogs of the Class A-Short Season New York–Penn League. In 2013, Gaviglio pitched for the Palm Beach Cardinals of the Class A-Advanced Florida State League, and had a 4–1 win–loss record and a 2.72 ERA in  innings pitched. He missed  months of the 2013 season recovering from a right forearm strain. After the season, the Cardinals assigned him to the Salt River Rafters of the Arizona Fall League.

In 2014, the Cardinals invited Gaviglio to spring training as a non-roster player. Gaviglio pitched for the Springfield Cardinals of the Class AA Texas League, completing the season with a 5–12 win–loss record and a 4.28 ERA in  innings pitched. While his season began with a 5.42 ERA in his first 14 games started, he finished the season with a 2.90 ERA in his final 11 games.

Seattle Mariners
After the season, the Cardinals traded Gaviglio to the Seattle Mariners for Ty Kelly. On May 11, 2017, he made his major league debut for the Mariners against the Toronto Blue Jays at Rogers Centre in Toronto.

Kansas City Royals
On September 1, Gaviglio was claimed off waivers by the Kansas City Royals. He was added to the active roster for the rest of the season and pitched at a 3.00 ERA over 12 innings.

Toronto Blue Jays
On March 21, 2018, Gaviglio was traded to the Toronto Blue Jays for cash considerations. He was recalled by the Blue Jays on May 11. Gaviglio spent most of the season in the Blue Jays rotation, finishing with a 3–10 record over 24 starts and 2 relief appearances. He struck out 105 batters in  innings. Gaviglio was designated for assignment on September 1, 2020, and released on September 4.

Texas Rangers
On January 30, 2021, Gaviglio signed a minor league contract with the Texas Rangers organization and was invited to Spring Training. In 5 games for the Triple-A Round Rock Express, he recorded a 2–1 record and 5.13 ERA.

SSG Landers
On June 4, 2021, Gaviglio’s contract was sold to the SSG Landers of the KBO League. He made his KBO debut on July 2 against the Lotte Giants, pitching 5.2 innings of 4-run ball with 2 strikeouts. Over the season, Gaviglio made 15 starts for SSG, going 6–4 with a 5.86 ERA and 70 strikeouts.

Los Angeles Dodgers
On January 28, 2022, Gaviglio signed a minor league contract with the Los Angeles Dodgers. He pitched in 17 games for the Triple-A Oklahoma City Dodgers (nine of which were starts), with a 6–4 record and 6.35 ERA. He was placed on the injured list on July 23 and remained there the rest of the season. He elected free agency on November 10, 2022.

Personal life
Gaviglio's brother, Gus, also starred for Ashland's baseball team. His long time girlfriend, also from Ashland, is Alaina Findlay. He is distantly related to former MLB player and manager Ralph Houk. , Gaviglio is married, with two daughters: Livia, born 2018, and Gianna, born 2020.

References

External links

1990 births
Living people
American expatriate baseball players in Canada
American people of Italian descent
Ashland High School (Oregon) alumni
Baseball players from Oregon
Batavia Muckdogs players
Buffalo Bisons (minor league) players
Gulf Coast Cardinals players
Jackson Generals (Southern League) players
Kansas City Royals players
Major League Baseball pitchers
Oklahoma City Dodgers players
Oregon State Beavers baseball players
Palm Beach Cardinals players
Quad Cities River Bandits players
Round Rock Express players
Salt River Rafters players
Seattle Mariners players
Sportspeople from Ashland, Oregon
Springfield Cardinals players
Tacoma Rainiers players
Toronto Blue Jays players
2017 World Baseball Classic players
2023 World Baseball Classic players